Leonard Vaughan (16 March 1908 – 1960) was an Australian cricketer. He played two first-class matches for New South Wales in 1925/26.

See also
 List of New South Wales representative cricketers

References

External links
 

1908 births
1960 deaths
Australian cricketers
New South Wales cricketers
Cricketers from Sydney